The co-epidemic of tuberculosis (TB) and human immunodeficiency virus (HIV) is one of the major global health challenges in the present time. The World Health Organization (WHO) reports 9.2 million new cases of TB in 2006 of whom 7.7% were HIV-infected. Tuberculosis is the most common contagious infection in HIV-Immunocompromised patients leading to death. These diseases act in combination as HIV drives a decline in immunity while tuberculosis progresses due to defective immune status. This condition becomes more severe in case of multi-drug (MDRTB) and extensively drug resistant TB (XDRTB), which are difficult to treat and contribute to increased mortality (see Multi-drug-resistant tuberculosis). Tuberculosis can occur at any stage of HIV infection. The risk and severity of tuberculosis increases soon after infection with HIV. A study on gold miners of South Africa revealed that the risk of TB was doubled during the first year after HIV seroconversion. Although tuberculosis can be a relatively early manifestation of HIV infection, it is important to note that the risk of tuberculosis progresses as the CD4 cell count decreases along with the progression of HIV infection. The risk of TB generally remains high in HIV-infected patients, remaining above the background risk of the general population even with effective immune reconstitution and high CD4 cell counts with antiretroviral therapy.

Tuberculosis and HIV infection
Mycobacterium tuberculosis is the most common cause of Tuberculosis disease (TB). Airborne transmission typically causes TB infection in both immunocompetent and immunocompromised hosts.

Tuberculosis, is categorized into two types of infection: latent infection or active TB disease.

After penetration into the respiratory tract, the Mycobacterium bacilli infect macrophages. T-lymphocytes start producing many cytokines (interferon gamma, interleukin-2, tumour necrosis factor alpha, and macrophage colony-stimulating factor) to activate macrophages and cytotoxic cells to inhibit their intracellular growth.
 Latent TB infection occurs when the immune system is successful in controlling the infection. Latent infection is usually asymptomatic and non contagious.
 Active TB disease appears when immune response is not sufficient in limiting the growth of infection. TB disease is symptomatic and contagious.

In those infected, there is a 5–10% chance that latent TB infection will progress into active tuberculosis disease. If proper treatment is not given in case of active disease, then death rate is about 50%.

HIV infection is a lifelong illness with three stages of disease. Medicine to treat HIV can slow or prevent progression from one stage to the next. Treatment can also reduce the chance of transmitting HIV to someone else.
 Stage 1 occurs in the first 2 to 4 weeks after infection.  When people have acute HIV infection, they have a large amount of virus in their blood and are very contagious. People with acute infection experience a flu-like illness and are often unaware that they're infected.
 Stage 2 is sometimes called asymptomatic HIV infection or chronic HIV infection. In this stage, HIV is still active but reproduces at very low levels. This stage varies between individuals but can last a decade or longer. By taking medicine to treat HIV (ART) the right way, this stage can last for several decades. HIV transmission can still occur in this stage. If not on medication, a person's viral load starts to go up and the CD4 cell count begins to go down.
 Stage 3 of HIV infection is AIDS. Patients with AIDS have severely  damaged immune systems increasing number of severe illnesses they contract (called opportunistic illnesses). Without treatment, people with AIDS typically survive about 3 years.  People with AIDS can have a high viral load and be very infectious.

Pathogenesis of co-infection of HIV and tuberculosis
HIV/TB infection is a bi-directional interaction of the two pathogens.

TB disease appears when the immune response is unable to stop the growth of mycobacteria. The cytokine IFN-γ plays a pivotal role in signaling of the immune system during infection. Reduced production of IFN-γ or its cellular receptors lead to severe and fatal TB.
During HIV infection, IFN-γ production is decreased dramatically which leads to an increased risk of developing reactivation or reinfection by M. tuberculosis in these HIV/TB patients.

TB may also influence HIV evolution. Proinflammatory cytokine production by tuberculous granulomas (in particular TNFα) has been associated with increased HIV viraemia, which might accelerate the course of disease. The risk of death in HIV/TB infected patients is twice that of HIV-infected patients without TB, with most deaths caused by progressive HIV infection, rather than TB.

Prevention
When HIV-negative children take isoniazid after they have been exposed to tuberculosis, their risk to contract tuberculosis is reduced. A Cochrane review investigated whether giving isoniazid to HIV-positive children can help to prevent this vulnerable group from getting tuberculosis. They included three trials conducted in South Africa and Botswana and found that isoniazid given to all children diagnosed with HIV may reduce the risk of active tuberculosis and death in children who are not on antiretroviral treatment. For children taking antiretroviral medication, no clear benefit was detected.

Treatment
It is currently recommended that HIV-infected individuals with TB receive combined treatment for both diseases, irrespective of CD4+ cell count. ART (Anti Retroviral Therapy) along with ATT (Anti Tuberculosis Treatment) is the only available treatment in present time. Though the timing of starting ART is the debatable question due to the risk of immune reconstitution inflammatory syndrome (IRIS). The advantages of early ART include reduction in early mortality, reduction in relapses, preventing drug resistance to ATT and reduction in occurrence of HIV-associated infections other than TB. The disadvantages include cumulative toxicity of ART and ATT, drug interactions leading to inflammatory reactions are the limiting factors for choosing the combination of ATT and ART.

A systematic review investigated the optimal timing of starting antiretroviral therapy in adults with newly diagnosed pulmonary tuberculosis. The review authors included eight trials, that were generally well-conducted, with over 4500 patients in total. The early provision of antiretroviral therapy in HIV-infected adults with newly diagnosed tuberculosis improved survival in patients who had a low CD4 count (less than 0.050 x 109 cells/L). However, such therapy doubled the risk for IRIS. Regarding patients with higher CD4 counts (more than 0.050 x 109 cells/L), the evidence is not sufficient to make a conclusion about benefits or risks of early antiretroviral therapy.

Research at molecular level
A study conducted on 452 patients revealed that the genotype responsible for higher IL-10 expression makes HIV infected people more susceptible to tuberculosis infection. Another study on HIV-TB co-infected patients also concluded that higher level of IL-10 and IL-22 makes TB patient more susceptible to Immune reconstitution inflammatory syndrome (IRIS). It is also seen that HIV co-infection with tuberculosis also reduces concentration of immunopathogenic matrix metalloproteinase (MMPs) leading to reduced inflammatory immunopathology.

References

Tuberculosis
HIV/AIDS